Pilsbryspira zebroides is a species of sea snail, a marine gastropod mollusk in the family Pseudomelatomidae, the turrids and allies.

See also: Crassispira melonesiana (Dall & Simpson, 1901)

Description
The length of the shell attains 14 mm.

Distribution
This species occurs in the Caribbean Sea off Colombia; the Dominican Republic and Jamaica; in the Atlantic Ocean off Northern Brazil.

References

External links
  Tucker, J.K. 2004 Catalog of recent and fossil turrids (Mollusca: Gastropoda). Zootaxa 682:1–1295.
 

Pseudomelatomidae
Gastropods described in 1876